Oceanic is an unincorporated community located within Rumson in Monmouth County, New Jersey, United States. Located on the north side of the borough, Oceanic contains most of Rumson's commercial businesses mainly along Bingham Avenue (County Route 8A) and River Road (CR 10). Bingham Avenue connects directly to the Oceanic Bridge over the Navesink River to the Middletown Township community of Locust Point.

References

Rumson, New Jersey
Unincorporated communities in Monmouth County, New Jersey
Unincorporated communities in New Jersey